The 1919 Penn Quakers football team was an American football team that represented the University of Pennsylvania as an independent during the 1919 college football season. In their fourth season under head coach Bob Folwell, the Quakers compiled a 6–2–1 record, shut out five of nine opponents, and outscored all opponents by a total of 283 to 40. The team played its home games at Franklin Field in Philadelphia.

Bert Bell, who later served as commissioner of the National Football League, was the team captain. End Heinie Miller was selected by Walter Camp as a first-team All-American.

Schedule

References

Penn Quakers football seasons
Penn Quakers football